Krasnopolye is a rural locality (a selo) and the administrative center of Krasnopolskoye Rural Settlement, Nekhayevsky District, Volgograd Oblast, Russia. The population was 453 as of 2010. There are 9 streets.

Geography 
Krasnopolye is located on 26 km northwest of Nekhayevskaya (the district's administrative centre) by road. Manino is the nearest rural locality.

References 

Rural localities in Nekhayevsky District